Sam Webster (born 16 July 1991) is a former New Zealand track cyclist. He was the sprint, keirin and team sprint World Champion at the 2009 Junior World Championships and New Zealand national track cycling champion. He won gold medals at the 2014 Commonwealth Games in the individual sprint and the team sprint.

Biography
Born in Auckland in 1991, Webster attended Auckland Grammar School. Webster is a track cyclist competing in a variety of sprint disciplines. His palmarès include a gold medal at the January 2009 Australian Youth Olympic Festival in the men's sprint. At the Junior World Championship in August 2009 in Moscow, he won gold in the team sprint, Keirin and sprint. From the Junior World Championships, he moved into the elite category. Webster is a member of the New Zealand team sprint team that has made the consistent climb at the World Championships, from Bronze in 2012 (Melbourne), Silver in 2013 (Minsk) and Gold in 2014 (Cali, Colombia), claiming their first World Champions rainbow jersey in the elite ranks.

At the 2010 Commonwealth Games in Delhi, Webster raced his way to Bronze in the sprint and Silver in the team sprint but suffered a big crash in the team sprint in the race for gold. At the 2016 Rio Olympics, he won alongside Eddie Dawkins and Ethan Mitchell a silver medal in the Cycling at the 2016 Summer Olympics – Men's Team Sprint.

At the 2018 Commonwealth Games, Webster won Gold in the team sprint event alongside Ethan Mitchell and Eddie Dawkins.

On 9 November 2022, Webster announced his retirement from cycling.

Major results

2009
1st Sprint, 2009 UCI Juniors Track World Championships
1st Keirin, 2009 UCI Juniors Track World Championships
1st Team Sprint, 2009 UCI Juniors Track World Championships
2nd Keirin, Oceania Cycling Championships
3rd Team sprint, Oceania Cycling Championships

2010
1st Sprintmeeting, Cottbus (August)
1st Sprintmeeting, Dudenhofen (September)
1st Sprintmeeting, Darmstadt (September)
2nd Team Sprint, 2010 Commonwealth Games, Delhi
2nd Team Sprint, UCI World Cup Classics, Melbourne
3rd Team Sprint, UCI World Cup Classics, Cali
3rd Sprint, 2010 Commonwealth Games, Delhi
3rd Keirin, New Zealand National Championships
6th Keirin, UCI Track World Championships, Copenhagen

2012
3rd Team Sprint, UCI Track World Championships, Melbourne

2013
2nd Team Sprint, UCI Track World Championships, Minsk

2014
1st Team Sprint, UCI Track World Championships, Cali
1st Sprint, 2014 Commonwealth Games, Glasgow
1st Team Sprint, 2014 Commonwealth Games, Glasgow

2015
2nd Team Sprint, UCI Track World Championships, Yvelines

2016
1st Team Sprint, UCI Track World Championships, London
2nd Team Sprint, 2016 Summer Olympics, Rio de Janeiro

2017
1st Team Sprint, UCI Track World Championships, Hong Kong

2018
1st Team Sprint, 2018 Commonwealth Games, Gold Coast
1st Sprint, 2018 Commonwealth Games, Gold Coast

Sponsors
Oakley
Cycle City

References

External links

1991 births
Living people
Commonwealth Games bronze medallists for New Zealand
Commonwealth Games gold medallists for New Zealand
Commonwealth Games silver medallists for New Zealand
Cyclists at the 2010 Commonwealth Games
Cyclists at the 2014 Commonwealth Games
New Zealand male cyclists
People educated at Auckland Grammar School
Cyclists from Auckland
UCI Track Cycling World Champions (men)
Cyclists at the 2016 Summer Olympics
Cyclists at the 2020 Summer Olympics
Olympic cyclists of New Zealand
Olympic silver medalists for New Zealand
Olympic medalists in cycling
Medalists at the 2016 Summer Olympics
Commonwealth Games medallists in cycling
Cyclists at the 2018 Commonwealth Games
New Zealand track cyclists
Cyclists at the 2022 Commonwealth Games
Commonwealth Games competitors for New Zealand
20th-century New Zealand people
21st-century New Zealand people
Medallists at the 2010 Commonwealth Games
Medallists at the 2014 Commonwealth Games
Medallists at the 2018 Commonwealth Games
Medallists at the 2022 Commonwealth Games